Tanna japonensis, also called the evening cicada or , is a species of cicada, a family of insects, and a member of the genus Tanna. It is distributed throughout East Asia, and is most common in Japan. Its shrill call can be heard most often in the morning and evening.

One of its possible kanji names (茅蜩) is derived from the character (茅) for a category of grasses that includes Miscanthus sinensis, a type of reed that it inhabits. In Japan, it is also known as  because of the noise that it makes.

Characteristics 
The male's abdomen is longer and thicker than that of the female, making it easy to distinguish between them. In addition, the intra-abdominal cavity of the male is more developed, giving it a more resonant call.

The body is coloured reddish-brown with green around the compound eye and in the centre and back of the thorax; mountain dwelling specimens tend to be darker.

Habitat 
In Japan, their habitat ranges from temperate Hokkaido in the far north to subtropical Amami Ōshima, close to Taiwan (variants and subspecies, such as T. j. ishigakiana), and live in a wide range of habitats. They live in the cypress, cedar, and hardwood forests, from the mountainous regions in Hokkaido to the plains of northern Kyūshū, and even in southern Kyushu, they can be found in slightly higher mountain elevations.

Ecology 

The parasitic moth Epipomponia nawai uses the animal as a host for its eggs.  The T. japonensis can also come under attack from flesh flies.

Call 

The peak time for hearing T. japonensis is autumn, but they can also be heard at the end of summer in some regions. From September until mid-October, their calls can be heard almost every day.

The males call with a distinctive, melancholy sound. This occurs before sunrise, and they often sing at twilight or after sunset, in dusk, when the temperature has dropped, or when it becomes cloudy. The call changes with temperature, being correlated with the firing rate of the tymbal nerve.

Their calls are quite loud, but do not carry well over distance.

Subspecies 
T. j. ishigakiana is found in Ishigaki, an island in Okinawa. Though once listed on the red list, they are no longer thought to be endangered. Their cry is a more metallic sound with a faster tempo.

References

Tanna (genus)
Hemiptera of Asia
Insects described in 1892